Rainbow Blue was the 2004 American Harness Horse of the Year as well as the Canadian Harness Horse of the Year. 

Racing at age two she won six or her seven starts including a division of the Debutante Stakes and the Molly Pitcher Pace. The filly won 20 of the 21 races she entered in 2004. Her only loss came when she went off stride in the Mistletoe Shalee. Her victory highlights included the $543,543 Fan Hanover Stakes final, the $222,500 Nadia Lobell Pace final, the Matron Stakes and the $610,000 Breeders Crown 3YO Filly Pace final. The bay filly is the daughter of Artiscape and Vesta Blue Chip. She retired with a lifetime mark of 1:49 2/5. Rainbow Blue was inducted into the United States Harness Racing Hall of Fame in 2012.

References

2001 racehorse births
American Standardbred racehorses
Racehorses bred in Maryland
American Champion harness horses
Harness Horse of the Year winners
United States Harness Racing Hall of Fame inductees
Harness racing in the United States